Malta Cricket Association is the official governing body of the sport of cricket in Malta. Its current headquarters is in Marsa, Malta. Malta Cricket Association is Malta's representative at the International Cricket Council and is an associate member and has been a member of that body since 1998. It is also a member of the European Cricket Council.

History 
The first recorded game in Malta is from 1800 between the sailors of Lord Nelson's fleet.

Domestic competitions

T20 League 
2008: Marsa CC
2009: Marsa CC
2010: Melita CC
2011: Melita CC
2012: Marsa CC
2013: Marsa CC (25 overs)
2014: Marsa CC
2015: Marsa CC (25 overs)
2016: Marsa CC (25 overs)
2017: Krishna CC
2018: Marsa CC
2019: Super Kings CC
2020: Knight Kings CC

T20 Winter League 

 2010-11: Marsa CC
 2011-12: Melita CC
 2012-13: Melita CC (30 overs)
 2013-14: Krishna CC (25 overs)
 2014-15: Melita CC
 2015-16: Melita CC (25 overs)
 2017: Marsa CC (30 overs)
 2017-18: Krishna CC (25 overs)
 2019-20: Valletta Vikings CC (50 overs)

T10 league 

 2020: Knights Kings CC

References

External links
Official site of Malta Cricket Association

Cricket administration
Cricket in Malta
Sports governing bodies in Malta